"I Palindrome I" is a song by American alternative rock duo They Might Be Giants.  It was the second single from Apollo 18, released in 1992 by Elektra Records.

They Might Be Giants performed the song on Late Night with David Letterman in 1992. Michael McKean recites the lyrics of the song in the documentary Gigantic: A Tale of Two Johns.

Composition
The title of "I Palindrome I" came from a demo written by John Flansburgh for They Might Be Giants's telephone service, Dial-A-Song. John Linnell adapted the lyric after attending a reading by the American poet Hal Sirowitz. The song's opening line, "Someday mother will die and I'll get the money", is a reference to Sirowitz's portrayal of mother-child relationships.

The song contains several palindromes and references to the concept of recursion. For example, the lyrics contain the straightforward palindromes "Egad, a base tone denotes a bad age" and "Man o nam". The middle 8 consists of what critic Stewart Mason calls a "sentence palindrome", in which the words (rather than the letters) are the units in a sequence which reads the same backwards and forwards: Son I am able,' she said, 'Though you scare me.' 'Watch,' said I. 'Beloved,' I said, 'Watch me scare you though.' Said she, 'Able am I, son. The lyrics also reference "a snake head eating the head on the opposite side" (an ouroboros), which reviewer Ira Robbins interprets as "a grim life mask [carved] from the conceptual clay of reversible phrases".

Reception
"I Palindrome I" received generally positive attention from critics. Writing for Allmusic, Stewart Mason concluded that the song was musically appealing enough to overcome its shallow lyrics, which he felt employed wordplay for its own sake rather than "in the service of a particular idea or emotion". In a review of Apollo 18, Karen Schlosberg said that the lyrics of "I Palindrome I" sound like "Edgar Allan Poe and David Lynch meeting the Monkees", creating an "unlikely sing-along hook". In a 2016 Gothamist retrospective revisiting They Might Be Giants's studio albums, Ken Bays noted "I Palindrome I" as a highlight for Linnell's strong vocal performance.

Track listing
 "I Palindrome I" – 2:22
 "Cabbagetown" – 2:24
 "Siftin'" – 1:54
 "Larger Than Life" – 4:17

Notes
"Larger Than Life" is a remix by Joshua Fried of the Apollo 18 track "She's Actual Size". The remix features guest vocals from members of Worl-A-Girl.

Personnel 
They Might Be Giants
John Flansburgh – vocals, guitar
John Linnell – vocals, keyboards, bass clarinet

Additional musicians
Kurt Hoffman – tenor sax on "Siftin'"
Miss Linda and Sensi – rap vocals on "Larger Than Life"

Production
They Might Be Giants – producer
Joshua Fried – producer on "Larger Than Life"
Paul Angelli – engineer on "I Palindrome I", "Cabbagetown", and "Siftin'"; mixing on "Cabbagetown" and "Siftin'"
Patrick Dillett – mixing on "Cabbagetown" and "Siftin'"
Poncho Goldstein – engineer on "Larger Than Life"
Rod Hui – mixing on "Larger Than Life"
Alan Winstanley – mixing on "I Palindrome I"

Artwork
J Otto Seibold – photography

References

External links
I Palindrome I EP at This Might Be A Wiki
"I Palindrome I" (song) at This Might Be A Wiki

1992 songs
Palindromes
They Might Be Giants songs
Elektra Records EPs